The 2007 1000 Guineas Stakes was a horse race held at Newmarket Racecourse on Sunday 6 May 2007. It was the 194th running of the 1000 Guineas.

The winner was Michael Ryan's Finsceal Beo, a chestnut filly trained by Jim Bolger at Coolcullen in County Carlow and ridden by Kevin Manning. Finsceal Beo's victory was the first in the race for her owner, trainer and jockey.

The contenders
The race attracted an unusually large field of twenty-one runners, seventeen trained in the United Kingdom, three in Ireland and one in Sweden. The favourite was the Jim Bolger-trained Finsceal Beo who had been named European Champion Two-year old Filly in 2006 when she had won the Rockfel Stakes in England and the Prix Marcel Boussac in France. The other Irish runners were Arch Swing the winner of the C. L. Weld Park Stakes and the Leopardstown 1,000 Guineas Trial Stakes, the Moyglare Stud Stakes winner Miss Beatrix, and the Aidan O'Brien-trained Theann. The best of the British-trained runners appeared to be the Cheveley Park Stakes winner Indian Ink and Simply Perfect, the winner of the May Hill Stakes and the Fillies' Mile and Scarlet Runner (Princess Margaret Stakes, Nell Gwyn Stakes). Finsceal Beo headed the betting at odds of 5/4 ahead of Indian Ink (17/2), Simply Perfect (9/1) and Arch Swing (10/1).

The race
Shortly after the start, the fillies split into two groups across the wide Newmarket straight, with the larger group racing up the stands side (the left of the course from the jockeys' viewpoint), with the smaller group running down the centre of the course. The 150/1 outsider Fantasy Parkes headed the stands side group from Scarlet Runner, Finsceal Beo and Treat, whilst the 250/1 shot Princess Valerina led the centre group from Arch Swing. The two groups merged after half a mile, by which point Scarlet Runner had taken the overall lead. A quarter of a mile from the finish, Scarlet Runner began to struggle and was overtaken by Finsceal Beo and Arch Swing, with Simply Perfect and Indian Ink making progress. In the closing stages, Finsceal Beo went clear and stayed on well to win by two and a half lengths from Arch Swing, with Simply Perfect one and a quarter lengths back in third. Treat finished fourth ahead of Indian Ink, who had failed to obtain a clear run a furlong from the finish.

Finsceal Beo's winning time was an "outstanding" 1:34.94. Her owner, Michael Ryan said "That was fantastic. We have a super filly and a super trainer. We'll drink every pub dry of Guinness between here and Stansted Airport tonight!"

Race details
 Sponsor: Stan James
 First prize: £198,730
 Surface: Turf
 Going: Good to Firm
 Distance: 8 furlongs
 Number of runners: 21
 Winner's time: 1:34.94

Full result

 Abbreviations: nse = nose; nk = neck; shd = head; hd = head; dist = distance; UR = unseated rider; DSQ = disqualified; PU = pulled up

Winner's details
Further details of the winner, Finsceal Beo
 Foaled: 19 February 2004
 Country: Ireland
 Sire: Mr Greeley; Dam: Musical Treat (Royal Academy)
 Owner: Michael Ryan
 Breeder: Rathberry Stud

References

1000 Guineas
 2007
1000 Guineas
1000 Guineas
2000s in Suffolk